Max Bucholz (3 November 1912 – 19 July 1996) was a German Luftwaffe ace and recipient of the Knight's Cross of the Iron Cross during World War II. Bucholz was credited with between 28 and 30 victories, including an ace in a day.

Early life and career
Bucholz was born on 3 November 1912 in Zerbst, at the time in the Duchy of Anhalt within the German Empire. He joined the Reichsmarine on 1 April 1931. There, he received his military basic training in the 2. Kompanie (2nd company) in the II. Abteilung (2nd department) of the Schiffsstammdivision (standing ship division) of the Baltic Sea in Stralsund. On 16 May 1939, Bucholz was transferred to the Luftwaffe.

World War II
World War II in Europe began on Friday 1 September 1939 when German forces invaded Poland. Bucholz had been posted to the 1. Staffel (1st squadron) of Jagdgeschwader 3 (JG 3—3rd Fighter Wing). At the start of the war, the Staffel was based at Brandis and commanded by Oberleutnant Werner Andres which was subordinated to I. Gruppe (1st group) headed by Major Otto-Heinrich von Houwald. Houwald was replaced by Hauptmann Günther Lützow on 3 November.

Battle of France
On 10 May 1940, the Wehrmacht began its offensive Operation Case Yellow (Fall Gelb), the invasion of France and the neutral Low Countries. I. Gruppe of JG 3 participated in the offensive as a subordinated unit of Jagdgeschwader 77 (JG 77—77th Fighter Wing). During the Battle of France, JG 77 was under control of I. Fliegerkorps (1st Air Corps), which formed the right wing of Luftflotte 3 (3rd Air Fleet) in Belgium and the Netherlands.

On 17 May, Bucholz claimed his first aerial victory and became an "ace-in-a-day". That day, the Royal Air Force (RAF) Bomber Command sent 12 Bristol Blenheim bombers from No. 82 Squadron against German ground forces advancing through the Gembloux Gap. With the exception of one Blenheim, all the bombers were shot down, including four by Bucholz. Later that afternoon, he shot down a Hawker Hurricane and a Curtiss P-36 Hawk near Saint-Quentin, taking his total to six aerial victories.

On 15 September, flying Messerschmitt Bf 109 E-1 (Werknummer 1563—factory number) during the Battle of Britain, he made a forced landing in the English Channel. His injuries required hospitalization in Boulogne.

War against the Soviet Union
In preparation for Operation Barbarossa, the German invasion of the Soviet Union, the I. Gruppe moved to an airfield at Dub on 18 June 1941. At the start of the campaign, JG 3 was subordinated to the V. Fliegerkorps (5th Air Corps), under command of General der Flieger Robert Ritter von Greim, which was part of Luftflotte 4 (4th Air Fleet), under command of Generaloberst Alexander Löhr. These air elements supported Generalfeldmarschall Gerd von Rundstedt's Heeresgruppe Süd (Army Group South), with the objective of capturing the Ukraine and its capital Kiev.

On 15 July 1941, Bucholz was appointed Staffelkapitän of 2. Staffel of JG 3. He succeeded Oberleutnant Helmut Meckel who had fallen ill. The Staffel was part of I. Gruppe of JG 3 then under the command of Hauptmann Hans von Hahn.

Western Front
In September 1941, with the exception of 3. Staffel which followed in November, I. Gruppe of JG 3 was transferred from the Eastern Front to Germany for rest and re-supply. In November 1941, it was transferred to the northern Netherlands and on 15 January 1942 re-designated II. Gruppe of Jagdgeschwader 1 (JG 1—1st Fighter Wing) in Katwijk. In consequence, 1. Staffel of JG 3 became the 4. Staffel of JG 1, 2. Staffel of JG 3 became the 5. Staffel of JG 1, and 3. Staffel of JG 3 became the 6. Staffel of JG 1.

Bucholz claimed last aerial victory during Operation Donnerkeil. The Channel Dash operation (11–13 February 1942) by the Kriegsmarine was codenamed Operation Cerberus by the Germans. In support of this, the Luftwaffe, formulated an air superiority plan dubbed Operation Donnerkeil for the protection of the three German capital ships. Flying from Haamstede on 12 February, Bucholz was credited with shooting down a Blenheim bomber. In May 1942, II. Gruppe was reequipped with the Focke Wulf Fw 190 A series, a radial engine powered fighter aircraft, at Woensdrecht Air Field.

Summary of career

Aerial victory claims
According to Obermaier, Bucholz was credited with 28 aerial victories claimed in approximately 170 combat missions. This figure includes 18 claims on the Eastern Front and ten over the Western Allies. Mathews and Foreman, authors of Luftwaffe Aces — Biographies and Victory Claims, researched the German Federal Archives and also found records for 28 aerial victory claims, including 18 aerial victories on the Eastern Front and ten on the Western Front.

Awards
 Flugzeugführerabzeichen
 Front Flying Clasp of the Luftwaffe in Gold
 Iron Cross (1939)
 2nd Class (26 May 1940)
 1st Class (30 May 1940)
 Honor Goblet of the Luftwaffe (11 October 1940)
 Wound Badge in Black (26 November 1940)
 Knight's Cross of the Iron Cross on 12 August 1941 as Oberleutnant and Staffelkapitän in the I./Jagdgeschwader 3

Notes

References

Citations

Bibliography

External links
TracesOfWar.com
Aces of the Luftwaffe
Ritterkreuztraeger 1939-1945

1912 births
1996 deaths
People from Zerbst
People from the Duchy of Anhalt
Luftwaffe pilots
German World War II flying aces
Recipients of the Knight's Cross of the Iron Cross
Military personnel from Saxony-Anhalt